The black snakehead (Channa melasoma) is a species of snakehead native to Thailand, Indonesia, Malaysia, Philippines, and Singapore. The Black Snakehead inhabits large to medium rivers that consists of acidic water and submerged roots. The Black Snakehead feeds on small animals and harmless to humans beings. Snakehead fish have long, slender bodies with long dorsal and butt-centric balances. They have an extensive mouth and distending jaw with canine-like teeth.  ]

References 

Black snakehead
Fish described in 1851